Paul Landers (born Heiko Paul Hiersche; 9 December 1964) is a German musician, notable as the rhythm guitarist for the Neue Deutsche Härte band Rammstein, and the punk rock band Feeling B.

Biography

Early life
Landers was born in East Berlin, East Germany, son of the Slavists Anton and Erika Hiersche. His mother comes from Ełk in Mazuria, Poland, and his father from Böhmisch Kahn, today Velké Chvojno, Czech Republic. Both parents had to leave their home countries after the Second World War and met during their studies in Halle (Saale). Landers lived in Moscow for a short time as a child. He can speak some Russian, as proven in his interviews with MTV Russia in 2004.

Music career

In 1983, at the age of 18, Landers became part of the East German punk band Feeling B, which was founded by singer Aljoscha Rompe and drummer Alexander Kriening. Some weeks later they recruited 16 year-old Christian "Flake" Lorenz to play bass, though Flake played just an organ at this point of time. Lorenz used his organ to create bass sounds for the new band. The band had various temporary drummers, including Christoph Schneider later in their career. Landers also played in a number of other bands including Die Firma and Die Magdalene Keibel Combo.

In the late 1980s, Landers met Till Lindemann during some showings of the GDR documentary "flüstern und SCHREIEN", which showed first of all some varieties of young music culture in the GDR. He also met Richard Kruspe, a friend of Lindemann, during this period. Some time after this, Landers played guitar in Lindemanns and Kruspe's band First Arsch. In 1992, that band released their only album, Saddle Up. Lindemann, Kruspe, Schneider, and bassist Oliver Riedel formed a new band called Templeprayers in 1993. They won the Berlin Senate Metro Beat Contest in 1994 that enabled them to have a four-track demo professionally recorded. Landers and Flake soon joined this band, which became known as Rammstein.

Personal life
When he married Nikki Landers in 1984 (at the age of 20), he took his wife's surname and switched his middle and first name, thus making his name Paul Landers. Paul also has a son born in 1990, Emil Reinke, and a younger daughter.

Equipment

Guitars
Gibson Paul Landers Signature Satin Black with grey binding; has 2 chrome covered EMG pickups, chrome bezels, and one volume knob.  Used in Dropped C and D tunings. Used during the Liebe Ist fur Alle Da tour. Was revealed as a signature model, available for sale at the 2012 Winter NAMM show.
Gibson Les Paul Studio All black with EMG pickups. Used in Drop C and Standard tuning. Used in Standard tuning only for performing "Rammstein".  Used during the Reise, Reise tour.
Music Man Axis and Van Halen Signature model Orange w/ Quilted maple top (Van Halen Signature), Silver (Van Halen Signature), Silver/Black Pickguard (Van Halen Signature), Maroon w/ Black pickguard, Black w/ White pickguard; Had stock DiMarzio pickups, but later changed for EMG pickups in 2004. Used in Dropped D and Standard tuning.  This was his main guitar since the beginning of Rammstein but was used less often during the Reise, Reise tour.
 ESP Eclipse I CTM Paul Landers Signature Satin Black with Silver binding, and a recently released version in Satin silver with Black binding, has EMG Pickups. Used in Standard tuning.  First used on tour during the Liebe Ist fur Alle Da tour. (2009–2010)
Sandberg Custom Plasma Guitar Clear acrylic guitar white LEDs inside of the body.  This guitar was used a few times during the Mutter tour for the song "Zwitter".
Ibanez AXS32 Translucent red with silver pickguard, used in Drop C. Was used during the Reise, Reise tour for "Morgenstern" and "Stein um Stein."
Fender Jazzmaster (This guitar was used in "Mein Land").
Amps
Fractal Axe-FX into Rocktron Velocity 300 power amp
Bogner Uberschall (He claims he began to use this amp because of the "Ultrasonic" Uberschall simulator in Native Instruments Guitar Rig, Former rig)

Also uses the signature Paul Landers PL1 Tech 21 FLyrig multi-effect pedal.

References

External links

Rammstein.com – official website

1964 births
Living people
Feeling B members
German heavy metal guitarists
German male guitarists
Musicians from Berlin
Rammstein members
Industrial metal musicians